Edenville is a small farming town situated in the northern Free State province of South Africa.

It was established on the farms Erfdeel-Noord, Langland and Welgelegen in 1912, and attained municipal status in 1921. The name is assumed to refer to the biblical Garden of Eden, but this is uncertain.

References

Populated places in the Ngwathe Local Municipality
Populated places established in 1912
1912 establishments in South Africa